Tunnuna was an ancient city and diocese in Roman Africa. It is now a Latin Catholic titular see.

History 
Tunnuna was located in modern Tunisia. It was important enough in Roman-era province of Africa Proconsularis to become one of the many suffragans of the capital Carthage's Metropolitan Archbishopric, but faded like most.

Titular see 
The diocese was nominally restored in 1933 as Titular bishopric of Tunnuna (Latin and Curiate Italian) / Tunnunen(sis) (Latin adjective).

It has had the following incumbents, so far of the fitting Episcopal (lowest) rank :
 George John Rehring (1967.02.25 – resigned 1970.12.31) as emeritate, formerly Titular Bishop of Lunda (1937.08.06 – 1950.07.16) as Auxiliary Bishop of Archdiocese of Cincinnati (USA) (1937.08.06 – 1950.07.16), Bishop of Toledo (USA) (1950.07.16 – retired 1967.02.25); died 1976
 Urbano José Allgayer (1974.02.05 – 1982.02.04) as Auxiliary Bishop of Archdiocese of Porto Alegre (Brazil) (1974.02.05 – 1982.02.04), next Bishop of Passo Fundo (Brazil) (1982.02.04 – retired 1999.05.19)
 Osvaldo Giuntini (1982.06.25 – 1987.04.30) as Auxiliary Bishop of Diocese of Marília (Brazil) (1982.06.25 – 1987.04.30), next Coadjutor Bishop of Marília (1987.04.30 – 1992.12.09), succeeding as Bishop of Marília (1992.12.09 – retired 2013.05.08)
 Narbal da Costa Stencel (1987.10.30 – death 2003.01.31) as Auxiliary Bishop of Archdiocese of (São Sebastião do) Rio de Janeiro (Brazil) (1987.10.30 – 2002.03.13)
 Edney Gouvêa Mattoso (2005.01.12 – 2010.01.20) as Auxiliary Bishop of Archdiocese of (São Sebastião do) Rio de Janeiro (Brazil) (2005.01.12 – 2010.01.20), next Bishop of Nova Friburgo (Brazil) (2010.01.20 – ...)
 Johannes Wilhelmus Maria Liesen (2010.07.15 – 2011.11.26) as Auxiliary Bishop of Diocese of ’s-Hertogenbosch (Netherlands) (2010.07.15 – 2011.11.26), next Bishop of Breda (Netherlands) (2011.11.26 – ...), also Vice-President of Episcopal Conference of the Netherlands (2016.06.14 – ...)
 Stephen Robson (2012.05.08 – 2013.12.11) as Auxiliary Bishop of Archdiocese of Saint Andrews and Edinburgh (Scotland, UK) (2012.05.08 – 2013.12.11), next Bishop of Dunkeld (Scotland) (2013.12.11 – ...)
 Bishop-elect Matthäus Karrer (2017.03.02 – ...), as Auxiliary Bishop of Diocese of Rottenburg–Stuttgart (southern Germany) (2017.03.02 – ...).

See also 
 List of Catholic dioceses in Tunisia
 Victor of Tunnuna

References

Sources and external links 
 GCatholic - data for all sections

Catholic titular sees in Africa
Former Roman Catholic dioceses in Africa
Roman Catholic titular bishops of Tunnuna